Barre is the most populous city in Washington County, Vermont, United States. As of the 2020 census, the municipal population was 8,491. Popularly referred to as "Barre City", it is almost completely surrounded by "Barre Town", which is a separate municipality.

Barre is often twinned with the nearby Vermont state capital of Montpelier in local media and businesses. It is the main city in the Barre-Montpelier micropolitan area, which has nearly 60,000 residents and is Vermont's third largest metropolitan area after those of Burlington and Rutland. Barre is also Vermont's fifth largest city.

History

On November 6, 1780, the land was granted to William Williams and 64 others. Originally called Wildersburgh, it included what is today both the town and city of Barre. It was first settled in 1788 by John Goldsbury and Samuel Rodgers, together with their families. But dissatisfied with the name Wildersburgh, citizens renamed the town after Isaac Barré, a champion of the American Colonies. In 1895, 4.0 square miles (10.4 km2) within the town was set off and incorporated as the separate city.  "In 1780 a tract of 19,900 acres of land in Vermont was chartered under the name of "Wildersburgh" to a number of proprietors. At a town-meeting of the inhabitants of this tract held in September, 1793, it was agreed that a house of worship should be erected, and it was voted that the man who would give the most towards building the same should have the right to name the township. Ezekiel Dodge Wheeler bid £62, and was permitted to name the township "Barre"—for Barre, Massachusetts, whence some of the settlers of the new township had emigrated."

Granite industry

Barre is the self-proclaimed "Granite Center of the World". Initially established with the discovery of vast granite deposits at Millstone Hill soon after the War of 1812, the granite industry and the city itself saw a boom with the arrival of the railroad. Large numbers of people migrated to Barre from Italy, Scotland, Spain, Scandinavia, Greece, Lebanon, Canada, and a number of other countries. The population increased from 2,060 in 1880, to 6,790 in 1890, to 10,000 in 1894. By the turn of the century, Barre was noted as the state's most diverse city.

Millstone Hill is now the site of a recreational, wooded trail network, where the mining holes and grout piles are still peppered throughout.

The Italian immigrants in particular brought a radical, largely anarchist labor movement to Barre. In the 1920s and 1930s, a number of granite strikes roiled the city; some disputes concerned wages, but workers increasingly mobilized to address health and hazard in the quarries and "sheds." The strike of 1922, arguably fought to a draw, raised ethnic tensions; French Canadians were painted as strikebreakers. The Quarry Workers' International Union of North America was based in Barre. They were originally affiliated with the Socialist Labor Party before affiliating with the Industrial Workers of the World, and in 1916 and in 1929 the city elected a Socialist Party candidate as mayor of Barre. The old Socialist Labor Party Hall is still standing, and was listed on the National Register of Historic Places in 2000.

"Barre Gray" granite is sought after worldwide for its fine grain, even texture, and superior weather resistance. Many sculpture artists prefer it for outdoor sculpture. In 1936 the granite quarry in Barre carved out a 35-ton cross from one section of stone in the quarry.

Hope Cemetery in Barre displays extensive examples of the sculptors' art.

Geography and climate
According to the United States Census Bureau, the city has a total area of 4.0 square miles (10.4 km2), all land. Barre is drained by the Stevens Branch River and Jail Branch River, tributaries of the Winooski River.

The city is served by Interstate 89, U.S. Route 302, Vermont Route 14 and Vermont Route 62. It is bordered by the town of Berlin to the west, but is otherwise surrounded by the separate Town of Barre.

Demographics

As of the census of 2000, there were 9,291 people, 4,220 households, and 2,253 families residing in the city.  The population density was 2,309.4 people per square mile (892.4/km2).  There were 4,477 housing units at an average density of 1,112.8 per square mile (430.0/km2).  The racial makeup of the city was 97.40% White, 0.48% Black or African American, 0.38% Native American, 0.52% Asian, 0.01% Pacific Islander, 0.32% from other races, and 0.89% from two or more races. Hispanic or Latino of any race were 1.68% of the population.

There were 4,220 households, out of which 26.3% had children under the age of 18 living with them, 37.0% were couples living together and joined in either marriage or civil union, 12.3% had a female householder with no husband present, and 46.6% were non-families. Of all households, 39.2% were made up of individuals, and 16.0% had someone living alone who was 65 years of age or older.  The average household size was 2.14 and the average family size was 2.86.

In the city, the population was spread out, with 22.4% under the age of 18, 7.9% from 18 to 24, 29.5% from 25 to 44, 27.0% from 45 to 69, and 13.2% who were 65 years of age or older.  The median age was 38 years. For every 100 females, there were 86.5 males.  For every 100 females age 18 and over, there were 82.6 males.

The median income for a household in the city was $30,393, and the median income for a family was $42,660. Males had a median income of $33,175 versus $20,319 for females. The per capita income for the city was $18,724.  About 9.9% of families and 13.0% of the population were below the poverty line, including 16.2% of those under age 18 and 12.6% of those age 65 or over.

Arts and culture
Alfred Hitchcock's movie The Trouble With Harry premiered at the Paramount Theater in Barre on September 27, 1955.

 Barre Opera House
 Studio Place Arts
 Vermont Historical Society
 Vermont Granite Museum
 Summer Street Mural Project

Government

The mayor of Barre is Jake Hemmerick. Barre City has a "weak mayor" form of government, and mayors serve two-year terms, with nonpartisan elections held in March.  The city is divided into three wards, and each ward elects two members of the city council.  Councilors serve staggered two-year terms, so one council seat from each ward is up for election every March.

Barre City also elects a full-time city clerk and treasurer.  The current Clerk and Treasurer is Carolyn S. Dawes.

The city of Barre employs a full-time city manager.  Nicolas Storellicastro currently holds this position.

Sports

A Premier Basketball League (PBL) team, the Vermont Frost Heaves, played its games in Barre at the Barre Auditorium and at the Memorial Auditorium in Burlington, Vermont. The team was originally owned by Sports Illustrated writer Alexander Wolff.  A local group later assumed ownership and operated the Heaves until the team ceased operations in late 2010 and subjected its players to a dispersal draft.

The Vermont Mountaineers, a collegiate summer baseball team which belongs to the New England Collegiate Baseball League, plays its home games at nearby Montpelier Recreation Field.

The quarter-mile, high-banked Thunder Road International Speedbowl is the premier motorsports venue in the state, and associated with notable NASCAR figures Ken Squier and Dave Moody. Vermont Governor Phil Scott often participates in the track's "Governor's Cup 150" among other events. Thunder Road is also frequented by the American Canadian Tour late-model series of New England, New York, and southeastern Canada. The track, which is located in Barre Town, was built in 1958 and has been in operation since 1960.

Parks and outdoor recreation 

 City Hall Park
 Cow Pasture (natural area)
 Currier Park
 Canales Woods Park
 Dente Park
 Municipal Swimming Pool
 Rotary Park
 South Barre Bike Path

Notable people 

 Gayleen Aiken, artist
 Norman Anderson, athlete
 David Ball, NFL player
 Lucina C. Broadwell, murder victim
 Thomas H. Cave, Vermont State Treasurer
 Deane C. Davis, 74th Governor of Vermont
 Ira Hobart Evans, Civil War era Medal of Honor recipient
 Young Firpo, boxer
 James Fisk, United States Senator and Congressman from Vermont
 Luigi Galleani, Italian anarchist
 Hollister Jackson, 54th lieutenant governor of Vermont
 Jennifer McMahon, novelist
 James F. Milne, Secretary of State of Vermont
 Dave Moody, sportscaster
 Katherine Paterson, author
 Charles Poletti, 46th Governor of New York
 Paul N. Poirier, member Vermont House of Representatives and Barre City Council
 Richard Romanus, actor
 Phil Scott, 82nd Governor of Vermont
 Socrates N. Sherman, member of the United States House of Representatives from New York
 Fred Swan, artist

Mayors of Barre
Mayors of Barre since it was incorporated as a city include:

 Emery L. Smith, 1895–1896
 John W. Gordon, 1896–1900
 Harvey Hersey, 1900–1901
 Nelson D. Phelps, 1901–1902
 Charles W. Melcher, 1902–1903
 J. Henry Jackson, 1903–1904
 William Barclay, 1904–1907
 John Robins, 1907–1910
 James Mutch, 1910–1912
 Lucius H. Thurston, 1912–1913
 William H. Ward, 1913–1915
 Frank E. Langley, 1915–1916
 Robert Gordon, 1916–1917
 Eugene C. Glysson, 1917–1920
 Frank E. Langley, 1920–1922
 Waldron Shield, 1922–1926
 Frank L. Small, 1926–1928
 Nelson E. Lewis, 1928–1929
 Fred W. Suitor, 1929–1931
 Edwin Keast, 1931–1932
 William W. LaPoint, 1932–1934
 John A. Gordon, 1934–1939
 Edwin F. Heininger, 1939–1944
 Chauncey M. Willey, 1944–1954
 Reginald T. Abare, 1954–1956
 Cornelius O. Granai, 1956–1958
 George N. Estivill, 1958–1964
 Cornelius O. Granai, 1964–1966
 Garth W. Blow, 1966–1968
 Wilfred J. Fisher, 1968–1978
 Vergilio L. Bonacorsi, 1978–1982
 Robert S. Duncan, 1982–1984
 Robert A. Bergeron, 1984–1990
 Wilfred J. Fisher, 1990–1992
 Harry S. Monti, 1992–1996
 Paul A. Dupre, 1996–2000
 Harry S. Monti, 2000–2004
 Peter D. Anthony, 2004–2006
 Thomas J. Lauzon, 2006–2018
 Lucas J. Herring, 2018–2022
 Jake Hemmerick, 2022–present

See also

 Robert Burns Memorial
 Edward F. Knapp State Airport—Barre's airport (located in Berlin)
 Central Vermont Medical Center—Barre's hospital (located in Berlin)
 Spaulding High School (Barre, Vermont)—Barre's public high school
 Aldrich Public Library
 Waskowmium—large collection of artworks founded by Mark S. Waskow, who lives in Barre

References

 A. J. Coolidge & J. B. Mansfield, A History and Description of New England; Boston, Massachusetts 1859

External links

 City of Barre official website
 Aldrich Public Library
 The Barre Players
 Central Vermont Chamber of Commerce
 Barre Granite Association

Sites of interest 
 Barre Opera House 
 Barre Museum
 Vermont Granite Museum
 Studio Place Arts
 Firehouse Inn

 
Cities in Vermont
Micropolitan areas of Vermont
 Barre City
Cities in Washington County, Vermont